Per Thomas Andersen (born 8 February 1954) is a Norwegian literary historian and novelist.

He was appointed professor at the University of Tromsø from 1992, and at the University of Oslo from 1993. His thesis from 1992 treated the decadence of Scandinavian literature of the period from 1880 to 1900. Among his other scientific works are Stein Mehren – en logosdikter from 1982, Norsk litteraturhistorie  from 2001, and Tankevaser from 2003. He published the novels Hold in 1985 and Arr in 1992. He is a fellow of the Norwegian Academy of Science and Letters.

References

1954 births
Living people
Norwegian literary historians
20th-century Norwegian novelists
21st-century Norwegian novelists
Academic staff of the University of Tromsø
Members of the Norwegian Academy of Science and Letters
Academic staff of the University of Oslo